Anthaenantiopsis is a genus of South American plants in the grass family.

 Species
 Anthaenantiopsis fiebrigii Parodi - Bolivia, Brazil, Argentina (Salta, Jujuy), Paraguay (Amambay)
 Anthaenantiopsis perforata (Nees) Parodi - Bolivia (Santa Cruz), Brazil (Goiás, Paraná), Paraguay
 Anthaenantiopsis rojasiana Parodi - Paraguay, Argentina (Corrientes, Misiones)
 Anthaenantiopsis trachystachya (Nees) Mez ex Pilg.  - Brazil, Bolivia, Paraguay

 Formerly included
see Paspalum 
 Anthaenantiopsis racemosa - Paspalum lachneum

See also
 List of Poaceae genera

References

Panicoideae
Poaceae genera
Flora of South America